Malcolm Joseph Bosse (May 6, 1926 – May 3, 2002) was an American author of both young adult and adult novels. His novels are often set in Asia, and have been praised for their cultural and historical information relating to the character's adventures. Bosse mostly wrote historical fiction novels after the publication of The Warlord, which became a best-seller. The Warlord was set in China in the 1920s. He also won the Deutscher Jugendliteraturpreis in 1983.

Bosse was born in Detroit, Michigan and died in New York City.  He is a graduate of Yale University and served in the U.S. Navy.  Bosse was also an English teacher in City College of New York in Manhattan.

Bibliography

Journey of Tao Kim Nam, 1959
The Incident at Naha, 1972 
The Man Who Loved Zoos, 1974 
(Co-editor) The Flowering of the Novel, 1975
The Seventy-nine Squares. New York: Thomas Y. Crowell. 1979. .
Cave beyond Time, (young adult) 1980
Ganesh (young adult), 1981, reprinted under title Ordinary Magic, 1993
The Barracuda Gang (young adult), New York: Dutton: Lodestar Books: 1982. . 
The Warlord: A Novel. New York: Simon And Schuster. 1983.  
Fire in Heaven New York: Simon and Schuster. 1985 .
Captives of Time, (young adult). New York: Delacorte Press: 1987. .
Stranger at the Gate, 1989
Mister Touch, 1991
The Vast Memory of Love, New York: Ticknor & Fields: 1992. .
Deep Dream of the Rain Forest (young adult), 1993
The Examination (young adult), 1994 
Tusk and Stone, 1995

References

External links 

Bosse, Malcolm, Jr.
Bosse, Malcolm, Jr.
Bosse, Malcolm, Jr.
Bosse, Malcolm, Jr.
Bosse, Malcolm, Jr.
Writers of historical fiction set in the modern age
American young adult novelists
American male novelists